Borma is one of the sub-districts  of Qaṣabah Jarash district in Jerash governorate, Jordan.

References 

 

Sub-districts of Jordan